Areias (Portuguese plural form of sand) is a former civil parish in the municipality of Santo Tirso, Portugal. In 2013, the parish merged into the new parish Areias, Sequeiró, Lama e Palmeira.

History
The iconic locality of Senhora da Torre, alongside the Ave, is the home to ancient ruins of castro from the Luso-Roman period of the region's history. It is also the location of a small chapel and lookout, the Miradouro da Senhora da Torre.

Until 1836 the parish was part of the municipality of Landim, until it was de-annexed and absorbed into Santo Tirso.

Geography
Areias is situated on the right margin of the Ave River, in the extreme north of the municipality.

Architecture
The parish is notable for a few national monuments, including:
 Nuno Álvares Institute
 Thermal heath spa

References

Former parishes of Santo Tirso